Tallahatchie County is a county in the U.S. state of Mississippi. At the 2020 census, the population was 12,715. Its county seats are Charleston and Sumner.

Tallahatchie County is located in the Mississippi Delta region, divided by the Tallahatchie River which runs from north to south through the county before joining what becomes the Yazoo River in LeFlore County.

History 

The county was founded on December 31, 1833, after most of the Choctaw Nation was forced out under Indian Removal. Tallahatchie is a Choctaw name meaning "rock river". The county is one of 10 in Mississippi with two county seats: Charleston on the east side of the river and Sumner on the west side. Charleston was the first county seat. Sumner was organized later in 1872 in the district to the west and has always been smaller in population.

Charleston was founded by European Americans in 1837, but its history antedates that. Settlers who were there illegally had developed five communities along the forks of Tillatoba Creek.

In 1833 the federal government opened the land for settlement by European Americans after the Choctaw were relocated to Indian Territory west of the Mississippi River, in what is now Oklahoma. Ancient Indian trails led through the county at the time. Most of the settlers entered the county over what was called Charley's Trace, an Indian trail that came across east from the Mississippi River and entered the hills about where Leverett is now located. Here the trail merged with a trail from the south and passed near the present site of Charleston.

Colonel Thomas Bailey came from Kentucky and formed the first European-American settlement on the north fork of the creek, which was about five miles to the northeast. He was later joined by James Bailey, Samuel Caruthers, William Flemming, M. Johnson, Willam Kendrick, Robert Thrasher, A. Patterson, and Kinchen Mayo, who extended the settlement along the creek toward the Junction. Another settlement was started by the Priddys, the J. Houstons, Cade Alford, and the Carson family, who extended the settlement along the creek to the junction of three forks.  

DeKalb and Tillatoba were founded on the north fork of the creek just west of the present town. Both towns wanted to be county seat of Tallahatchie, and Tillatoba gained the distinction. In 1837 the Board of Police found it necessary to abandon Tillatoba.

A section of unsettled land lay at the heart of the first five settlements. Under the Dancing Rabbit Treaty of 1830, this section of land had been granted to Greenwood LeFlore, the leading Choctaw chief. He stayed in Mississippi on his land after most of his people moved to Indian Territory.

J.S. Topp & Co. had acquired this section of land and proposed to build the town of Charleston (named for Charleston, South Carolina). He hoped to have this designated as the permanent county seat. In 1843 the county seat fight flared up again. The board voted to abandon Charleston, but Mr. Steel, president of the Board of Police, refused to sign the minutes which killed the rally.

J.B. Sumner moved to this section in 1872 and founded what is now Sumner. The present site was a dense forest. He donated land for the railroad right-of-way, railroad park, and courthouse square and jail lot. The next year Presbyterians erected Maria Church. From 1882 through 1884 disastrous floods and overflows of the Tallahatchie River forced the people of Sumner to go by boat for supplies to Webb (which was at the time called Hood). A post office was established in 1885, and the town incorporated in 1900.

The first county court house in Sumner was built in 1902; it was destroyed by fire in 1908. The records were saved, but in 1909 the entire business section of the town burned, and all records were destroyed. From 1931 through 1933, floods inundated thousands of acres of farmland and destroyed much property.

Sumner's county courthouse was the site of the 1955 murder trial of two white men, J.W. Milam and Roy Bryant, accused in the lynching and murder of Emmett Till that year in adjoining Leflore County. They were acquitted by an all-white jury of the murder of Till, a teenage African-American boy from Chicago. In 1990, the courthouse was designated as a state landmark by the Mississippi Department of Archives and History.

That same year, in nearby Glendora, Mississippi, resident Elmer Kimbrell shot and killed African-American Clinton Melton in front of three witnesses after an argument about how much gas Melton pumped into Kimbrell's car. He was acquitted after a short trial. Shortly before this murder, Kimbrell was involved in the Emmett Till murder.

Geography
The county is intersected by the Tallahatchie River.

Major highways
  U.S. Highway 49
  Mississippi Highway 3
  Mississippi Highway 8
  Mississippi Highway 32
  Mississippi Highway 35

Adjacent counties
 Quitman County (north)
 Panola County (northeast)
 Yalobusha County (east)
 Grenada County (southeast)
 Leflore County (south)
 Sunflower County (southwest)
 Coahoma County (northwest)

National protected areas
 Coldwater River National Wildlife Refuge (part)
 Tallahatchie National Wildlife Refuge (part)

Demographics

2020 census

As of the 2020 United States Census, there were 12,715 people, 4,369 households, and 2,775 families residing in the county.

2010 census
As of the 2010 United States Census, there were 15,378 people living in the county. 56.4% were Black or African American, 38.9% White, 0.8% Asian, 0.3% Native American, 0.1% Pacific Islander, 2.4% of some other race and 1.2% of two or more races. 5.6% were Hispanic or Latino (of any race).

2000 census
As of the census of 2000, there were 14,903 people, 5,263 households, and 3,826 families living in the county.  The population density was 23 people per square mile (9/km2).  There were 5,711 housing units at an average density of 9 per square mile (3/km2).  The racial makeup of the county was 59.43% Black or African American, 39.62% White, 0.09% Native American, 0.36% Asian, 0.05% from other races, and 0.46% from two or more races.  0.92% of the population were Hispanic or Latino of any race.

There were 5,263 households, out of which 34.00% had children under the age of 18 living with them, 43.50% were married couples living together, 23.50% had a female householder with no husband present, and 27.30% were non-families. 24.60% of all households were made up of individuals, and 11.60% had someone living alone who was 65 years of age or older.  The average household size was 2.81 and the average family size was 3.36.

In the county, the population was spread out, with 30.00% under the age of 18, 10.00% from 18 to 24, 25.90% from 25 to 44, 20.90% from 45 to 64, and 13.20% who were 65 years of age or older.  The median age was 33 years. For every 100 females there were 87.80 males.  For every 100 females age 18 and over, there were 84.40 males.

The median income for a household in the county was $22,229, and the median income for a family was $26,509. Males had a median income of $24,766 versus $18,972 for females. The per capita income for the county was $10,749.  About 26.80% of families and 32.20% of the population were below the poverty line, including 43.80% of those under age 18 and 27.80% of those age 65 or over.

Tallahatchie County has the fourth lowest per capita income in Mississippi and the 46th lowest in the United States.

Government and infrastructure

Tallahatchie County Correctional Facility, a private prison operated by the Corrections Corporation of America on behalf of the Mississippi Department of Corrections, is located in an unincorporated area in the county, near Tutwiler. As of 2010 the prison serves as the Tallahatchie County's jail facility, in addition to housing prison inmates sentenced in California.

Education
 Public School Districts
 East Tallahatchie School District (Charleston)
 Charleston High School
 West Tallahatchie School District (Webb)
 West Tallahatchie High School
 '''Private Schools (None)
 Strider Academy (closed in 2018)

Coahoma Community College is the designated community college.

Communities

City
 Charleston (county seat)

Towns
 Sumner (county seat)
 Tutwiler
 Webb

Village
 Glendora

Unincorporated communities
 Brazil
 Cascilla
 Cowart
 Effie
 Enid
 Leverett
 Macel
 Minter City (partly in Leflore County)
 Paynes
 Philipp
 Sharkey
 Swan Lake
 Teasdale
 Tippo
 Vance (partly in Quitman County)
 Whitehead

Ghost towns
 Crevi
 Midway
 Murphreesboro
 Needmore

See also
 National Register of Historic Places listings in Tallahatchie County, Mississippi

 USS Tallahatchie County (LST-1154)

References

 
Mississippi counties
Mississippi placenames of Native American origin
1833 establishments in Mississippi
Populated places established in 1833
Black Belt (U.S. region)
Majority-minority counties in Mississippi